"Nightlight" is a song by American DJ and producer Illenium featuring uncredited vocals from Annika Wells. It is his first new single since signing with independent record label 12Tone and Warner Records.

Background
Illenium said: "It's a love song, and it's a peaceful love song, where you're in the dark going through shit, and you have someone that's your light at the end of the tunnel, a way out...and hopefully, there's some news of maybe some life returning next year or something like that, and this music translates to some excitement from that, giving some more life to people who are struggling right now."

Charts

Weekly charts

Year-end charts

References

2020 singles
2020 songs
Illenium songs
Future bass songs
Songs written by Illenium